Mary Davies is a former Welsh international lawn bowler.

Bowls career
Mary was part of the fours Welsh team that competed at the 1994 Commonwealth Games in Victoria.

In 1993 she won the triples gold medal and the fours silver medal at the inaugural Atlantic Bowls Championships.

Davies just missed out on medal during the 1992 World Outdoor Bowls Championship after losing the triples bronze play off.

She is a multiple Welsh champion winning the Welsh National Bowls Championships seven times (triples 1990, 1991, 2001, fours 1993, 1998 1999 and pairs 1997) and has won two British Isles Bowls Championships titles.

References 

Welsh female bowls players
Living people
Year of birth missing (living people)
Bowls players at the 1994 Commonwealth Games